Bulcsú Kál Hoppál (born 24 September 1974) is a Hungarian theologian and philosopher.

Biography
In 1999 he received a Bachelor's degree in Sacred Theology at Pázmány Péter Katolikus Egyetem in Budapest. In 2002 he received a Licentiate there in the same subject—the equivalent of a Ph.D. In 2003, he received the degree of Magister der Philosophie from the International Academy for Philosophy in the Principality of Liechtenstein. He is one of the vice-presidents of the Hungarian Association for the Academic Study of Religion.

Publications

Books
Hoppál has written or edited several books, mostly on the subject of Saint Thomas Aquinas; most of them have been published by  France-based international academic publisher L'Harmattan.

Other publications

Filmography
Hoppál is also a film-maker, and has been involved in the following productions:

…s mondják neki, csángó… (with Péter Csabá Kocsis); director, 2005. Presented at: Magyarkanizsa, Cnesa Kulturális Központ (SCG)
…visszafelé csak az Isten tudja… Gyón – 1956 (with Péter Csabá Kocsis); director, 2006. (supported by Hungarian Historical Film Foundation); MADE Festival 2006, winner.
…jó volt, hogy volt… Magyarfalusi Napok 2006., co-director. Subregional and Small Community Television, IX. Film Festival in memory of Geza Radvanyi: winner; Folk art film festival, 2007; Rákóczifalva, 2007: 3rd place). With Péter Csabával Kocsis.
Gáborok, experimental documentary, director. IV. National Independent Documentary History Review 2008: winner.
Volt az a pár nap…, director. With support of Újbuda XI. kerületi Önkormányzat.
Szadduceus (with Dániel Havasi), director, 2009. Faludi Akadémia "Csoda" Film Festival: winner.
Tamási, 1956 (with Dániel Havasi and András K. Németh), director, 2010.
Cigányok az 1956-os forradalomban [Gypsies of the 1956 Revolution]. (with Dániel Havasi), director and scenario, 2011.

References

Living people
1974 births
Hungarian philosophers
Hungarian Roman Catholic theologians